The ironclad Zaragoza was a Royal Spanish Navy wooden-hulled armored frigate completed in 1868. She later served as a training ship and was stricken from the naval register in 1896.

Design and description
She displaced . Her crew consisted of 548 officers and enlisted men.

The ship was fitted with a pair of imported John Penn and Sons trunk steam engines that drove one propeller shaft using steam provided by six cylindrical boilers. The ship had a cost of 7,096,460 pesetas.

The frigate's main battery was originally intended to consist of thirty  smoothbore guns mounted on the broadside, but she was completed with four  and fourteen 200-millimeter guns, all smoothbores, on the gun deck. On the main deck above them were two  smoothbores, one on each broadside, and another in the forecastle as the forward chase gun. By 1883, the smoothbore guns had been replaced by rifled muzzle-loading (RML) guns. Four Armstrong-Whitworth  and eight  Palliser guns were located on the gun deck and three  Palliser guns were mounted on the main deck.

Above the belt, the guns, except for the chase gun, were protected by  armor plates. The ends of the ship and the deck were unarmored.

Construction and career
Her construction period was lengthy, and she was not launched until 6 February 1867. She was completed in June 1868 and commissioned in July 1868.

Zaragoza saw action in the Third Carlist War of 1872–1876. She underwent a major overhaul in 1889. In 1892, she was relegated to use as a torpedo training ship at Cartagena. She was stricken in 1896 and scuttled in 1899.

Footnotes

References
 
 

 

1867 ships
Ships built in Cartagena, Spain
Ironclad warships of the Spanish Navy
Scuttled vessels
Shipwrecks of Spain
Maritime incidents in 1899